The Theban Tomb TT215 is located in  Deir el-Medina. It forms part of the Theban Necropolis, situated on the west bank of the Nile opposite Luxor.

TT215 is a chapel and shrine of the ancient Egyptian royal scribe in the Place of Truth  named Amenemopet, who lived during the 19th Dynasty. The actual burial place for Amenemopet is TT265.
Amenemopet was the son of Minmose and Isis who are mentioned in TT335. Amenemopet's wife was named Hathor and also called Hunero.

See also
 List of Theban tombs

References

Theban tombs
Nineteenth Dynasty of Egypt